Douglas Junior Ross Santillana (born 19 February 1986), commonly known as Junior Ross, is a Peruvian footballer who plays as a winger. He is currently a free agent.

Club career
Ross made his debut at the beginning of the 2004 season with Coronel Bolognesi, in the Torneo Descentralizado. After two years he was loaned out to Cienciano del Cuzco. There he played 15 games and scored four goals, than returned to Bolognesi. In January 2007, he moved to the Capital City to join Alianza Lima on loan. There he played 16 games and scored two goals, before returning Bolognesi in January 2008.

He finished as the Clausura Champion for the second half of the 2007 season with Coronel Bolognesi. He also played in the Copa Libertadores and Copa Sudamericana.

On 2 February 2009, he was signed by German 2. Bundesliga side FSV Frankfurt on a loan deal until the end of the season. Moreover, Werder Bremen has a signing option on him for summer 2009. Neither FSV Frankfurt nor Werder Bremen claimed the signing option so Ross went back to Coronel Bolognesi. On 19 December 2010, he signed a half-year contract with Arka Gdynia.

International career
Ross has made 10 appearances for the senior Peru national football team.

Honours
Coronel Bolognesi
Clausura: 2007

Sporting Cristal
Torneo Descentralizado: 2012

References

External links
 
 Junior Ross at footballdatabase.eu
 

1986 births
Living people
Sportspeople from Callao
Peruvian footballers
Peru international footballers
Peruvian expatriate footballers
Coronel Bolognesi footballers
Cienciano footballers
Club Alianza Lima footballers
FSV Frankfurt players
Juan Aurich footballers
Arka Gdynia players
Sporting Cristal footballers
Sport Boys footballers
Deportivo Municipal footballers
Peruvian Primera División players
Ekstraklasa players
2. Bundesliga players
Peruvian expatriate sportspeople in Germany
Peruvian expatriate sportspeople in Poland
Expatriate footballers in Germany
Expatriate footballers in Poland
Association football wingers